Henry Stewart (10 May 1749 – September 1840) was an Irish politician.

He sat in the House of Commons of Ireland as a Member of Parliament for Longford Borough from 1783 to 1790 and from 1791 to 1799.

References 
 

1749 births
1840 deaths
Irish MPs 1783–1790
Irish MPs 1790–1797
Irish MPs 1798–1800
Members of the Parliament of Ireland (pre-1801) for County Longford constituencies